Papps is a surname. Notable people with the surname include:

Alex Papps (born 1969), Greek-Australian actor, television host, writer, and singer
Michael Papps (born 1979), New Zealand cricketer
Peter Papps (born 1939), Australian sports shooter
Stephen Papps, New Zealand actor

See also
Papp (disambiguation)